New York State Route 278 (NY 278) is a state highway in Rensselaer County, New York, in the United States. The route,  in length, is located in a rural section of the town of Brunswick. It climbs uphill from a southern terminus at NY 2 in the hamlet of Clums Corners to its northern end at NY 7. The road was taken over by the state of New York in 1905 and designated NY 278 .

Route description 

NY 278 begins at an intersection with NY 2 in the hamlet of Clums Corners, located within a valley in eastern Brunswick. The highway progresses northwestward, intersecting with County Route 129 (CR 129, Tamarac Road) before ascending in elevation and continuing out of Clums Corners as Brick Church Road. NY 278 passes some farms and buildings as it traverses several small hills and intersects with the northern terminus of CR 133 (Moonlawn Road). The route descends slightly from here, passing some more farms and the namesake brick church before terminating at an intersection with NY 7 (Hoosick Street) northeast of Brunswick Center.

History
On June 13, 1904, the state of New York let a contract to improve what is now NY 278 and a roughly  stretch of modern NY 2 to state highway standards. The project cost just over $33,440 (equivalent to $ in ) and was completed by mid-1905. The  of highway improved by the project were added to the state highway system on August 25, 1905, and internally designated as State Highway 197 (SH 197). The segment of SH 197 northwest of Clums Corner did not receive a posted designation until , when it was designated as NY 278.

Major intersections

See also

References

External links

278
Transportation in Rensselaer County, New York|